Paraphosphorus bipunctatus is a species of beetle in the family Cerambycidae. It was described by Charles Joseph Gahan in 1902. It is known from Tanzania, Kenya, and Uganda.

References

Tragocephalini
Beetles described in 1902